Murray Royce De Laine (born 29 August 1936) is a former Australian politician. He worked for General Motors-Holden for 35 years and was a shop steward and executive member of the Association of Draughting, Supervisory and Technical Employees (ADSTE). He represented the electorate of Price as a Labor Party member of the South Australian House of Assembly between 1985 and 2001.

Political career 
De Laine was elected to the seat of Price on 7 December 1985. In 1998 the seat of Price was heavily altered in a redistribution and renamed Cheltenham. In August 2001 De Laine was defeated in a Labor Party pre-selection ballot which saw Jay Weatherill take the pre-selection. On 15 August 2001 De Laine quit Labor and announced he would run as an independent at the next state election. In the 2002 election De Laine stood as an independent and was defeated, with 9.7% of the primary vote.

References

External links

1936 births
Living people
Members of the South Australian House of Assembly
Independent members of the Parliament of South Australia
Australian Labor Party members of the Parliament of South Australia
21st-century Australian politicians